Myrmecodemus is a genus of beetles in the family Carabidae, containing the following species:

 Myrmecodemus formicoides Sloane, 1910
 Myrmecodemus globulicollis (Macleay, 1888)
 Myrmecodemus lucai Baehr, 2005
 Myrmecodemus pilosellus Baehr, 2005
 Myrmecodemus riverinae (Sloane, 1890)

References

Lebiinae